Queensland Newspapers is the Queensland, Australia-based subsidiary of News Corporation. Queensland Newspapers is responsible for publishing The Courier-Mail daily newspaper.

List of Queensland Newspapers
Toowoomba Chronicle

References 

News Corporation subsidiaries
Newspaper companies of Australia